The Mahindra Thar is a compact, four-wheel drive, off-road SUV manufactured by Indian automaker Mahindra and Mahindra Ltd.  


First generation (2010) 

The vehicle was launched in the Indian market on October 4, 2010 to fill the void left by its predecessor, the Mahindra MM540. The Thar has been voted one of the top-10 SUVs available in the Indian market. Three variants - DI 2WD, DI 4WD, and CRDe, are available with soft-top versions. The Thar also comes with a seven-seater option, though it can be converted into a two-seater.

Mahindra Roxor

On March 2, 2018, Mahindra Automotive North America unveiled a variant of the Thar for United States market called the Roxor at its assembly plant in Auburn Hills, Michigan. It is assembled from complete knock-down kits. Unlike the Thar, the Roxor is not street legal, and is positioned as a side-by-side off-road vehicle with a top speed of 45 mph. The Roxor is powered by a 2.5 L turbodiesel, four-cylinder engine producing 62 hp and 144 lb-ft of torque, mated to a five-speed manual transmission. An automatic transmission is available as an option. It is only available with two seats, a 148-inch body length, and a 96-inch wheelbase.

Second generation (2020) 

The second generation Thar was unveiled on August 15, 2020.
 It became available in October 2020.

It comes with two engine options, a 2.0-litre petrol and a 2.2-litre diesel. Both are offered with a choice of 6-speed automatic transmission (with a torque converter gearbox) made by Aisin or 6-speed manual transmission. Customers have the option to choose between a hard top, soft top or soft top with convertible like folding down mechanism.

Safety
Global NCAP crash-tested the second-generation Mahindra Thar in its basic safety specification of two airbags and ISOFIX anchorages in 2020 (similar to Latin NCAP 2013). It achieved four stars for adult protection, with its passenger compartment remaining stable in the offset frontal test. However, its footwell ruptured during the test. The car was penalised for instability of footwell response and for this reason Mahindra was denied the opportunity of demonstrating that sharp structures in the dashboard could prove benign to the knees of differently sized occupants. Hence Global NCAP penalised the knee areas and the vehicle could not achieve the maximum five star rating for adult protection.

Nevertheless, Mahindra requested an ECE side impact test for the Thar, in which the car passed this basic test despite not being fitted with side airbags. The driver's seat in the Mahindra Thar is high enough for the car to be exempted from this regulation, but Global NCAP required that the test be performed nevertheless. However, since the Thar lost crucial points in the frontal impact, the side impact had no influence on the result.

The Mahindra Thar was sold in a basic trim level with side-facing rear seats. These seats were not fitted with three-point seatbelts or ISOFIX anchorages and would render the vehicle unsuitable for safely transporting children, which would cause Global NCAP to award the car no stars for child occupant protection. Global NCAP warned Mahindra to withdraw this variant of the Thar from the market, failing which they would publish a result of this basic variant in addition to the tested variant. Global NCAP only agreed to publish the result of a variant with forward-facing seats after sales of the basic variant were stopped, making forward-facing seats the basic specification for the model.

Mahindra also requested Global NCAP to test the Thar's optional electronic stability control. The model met minimum performance requirements for yaw rate in the UN's test with a steering robot, but it showed unstable dynamic behaviour with tendency to roll, and Global NCAP recommended an improvement, to deliver a more robust performance in real-life scenarios.

The Thar is not fitted with side impact airbags for the body or head, even as an option.

References

External links 
Mahindra Thar

Jeep platforms
Thar
Cars introduced in 2010
ATVs
Compact sport utility vehicles
Off-road vehicles
Global NCAP small off-road
2010s cars